Jack McGrath may refer to:

Jack McGrath (footballer) (1924–2013), Australian rules footballer for Geelong
Jack McGrath (rugby union) (born 1989), Irish rugby union player
Jack McGrath (racing driver) (1919–1955), American racecar driver
Jack McGrath (American football), American football player and coach